Makna, also known as Magna, is a town in Tabuk Province of Saudi Arabia. Located  at 28° 23' 51"N and  34° 44' 59"E. it is on the coast of Gulf of Aqaba southwest of Al-Bad', Saudi Arabia. It lies on the border of the Hejaz region, and was in antiquity in Southern Midian. The Red Sea near Makna hold pristine Coral reefs and is renowned as a scuba dive site.

Local tradition holds that "Bir al Saidni" located in Makna, is the well from which Moses rolled away the stone to draw water for the flocks of Jethro's daughters. A Jewish community at was known here from at least the 9th century.

References

Populated coastal places in Saudi Arabia
Populated places in Tabuk Province
Underwater diving sites in Saudi Arabia
Red Sea